Hélène (Di Nella) Courtois (born 1970) is a French astrophysicist specialising in cosmography. She is a professor at the University of Lyon 1 and has been a chevalier of the Ordre des Palmes Académiques since 2015.

As the director of a research team at the Lyon Institut de Physique des 2 Infinis (IP2I)—formerly the Institute of Nuclear Physics (IPNL)—and co-director of two international teams (Cosmic Flows and CLUES), she is best known for her investigations into the dynamic cosmography of the Universe. Her work has concentrated on the distribution of matter in the large-scale structure of the Universe. In 2006, she participated in the confirmation of the acceleration in the expansion of the Universe via the study of supernovae. In 2014, she proposed a redefinition of the notion of galactic superclusters, and identified the Laniakea Supercluster, an agglomeration that is bigger than the Virgo Supercluster by a factor of 100. In 2017, she showed that cosmic voids produce a repulsive effect resulting in galactic displacements; this may also explain the cold spot in the cosmic microwave background.

Biography
Hélène Di Nella was born in 1970. She obtained a PhD (doctorate) from the University of Grenoble 1 in 1995, with her thesis titled Structure et cinématique de l'univers local.

Career

Research work
Courtois began her research into the large-scale structure of our cosmic neighbourhood in the early 1990s while at the Lyon Observatory. In 1994, she revealed a superstructure comprising 27,000 galaxies, with a radius of about 290 million light-years. By studying the distribution of thousands of galaxies and modelling their structures, her team showed that these galaxies were not spherically distributed in space, but instead created a shape like a squashed football or a silkworm cocoon.

Courtois and her team have studied the convergent behaviour of the galaxies of the Laniakea supercluster. By modelling the movement of galaxies as though they were streams in a watershed or basin, they were able to map out the boundaries of this local agglomeration. They have adapted the technique to model the Vela Supercluster, which was discovered in 2016. They used their data to compute the flow rate of the galaxies towards the 'centre', thereby making it possible to infer the masses of the galaxies. Using this information, they will be able to determine the shape and size of the Vela supercluster.

In 2017, Courtois revealed two discoveries: one, called the Dipole repeller, and the other, on the cosmic microwave background cold spot, which could potentially explain the propagation of our galaxy through space at about 2 million kilometres per hour.

In 2019, her team released a new map of the local universe, encompassing a volume 10 times larger than that released in 2014.

Scientific administration
In the 2000s, Courtois led the cosmology team at the Lyon Observatory. In 2006, she set up the research programme Cosmic Flows. Its major result has been the discovery of the frontiers of the supercluster named Laniakea that defines our cosmic neighbourhood.

Since 2013, she has been the head of the IP2I Observational Cosmology / Euclid research group. It is one of the world leaders in the field of cosmology dedicated to the observation, analysis and digital reproduction of the distribution and dynamics of dark matter and galaxies in the nearby universe.

Courtois oversaw the creation of a comprehensive programme of university studies in the sciences of the universe, hosting annually more than 500 students from University of Lyon 1. Courtois has been an expert adviser at the European Commission for research and education programmes in physics and astrophysics since 2009. She is also a patron of the Vaulx-en-Velin planetarium.

Honours
In 2015, Courtois was named a senior member of the Institut Universitaire de France and was made a chevalier of the Ordre des Palmes Académiques. She also received a festival prize for her film Cartographier l'univers : à la découverte de Laniakea.

In 2016, she became a vice-president of the University of Lyon 1, responsible for international relations.

Her book Voyage sur les flots de galaxies won the 2017 Prix Ciel & Espace du livre d'astronomie.
In 2017, she was ranked in the top 50 most influential French personalities by Vanity Fair.

In 2018, she received the "Eureka" prize for science communication. She was also elected as the most influential French Scientist of the year by the Foreign affairs ministry.

In 2019, she was nominated in the top 3 of the 50 most influential women in her home city, Lyon.

On 1 January 2020, Courtois was made a Chevalier of the Légion d'honneur.

Selected works

Articles

Books

References

External links 
 
  The Dipole Repeller  Film produced as part of the article: "The Dipole Repeller".

French astrophysicists
1970 births
Living people
Grenoble Alpes University alumni
Chevaliers of the Légion d'honneur